Climate change in Afghanistan has led to a temperature increase of 1.8°C since 1950 in the country. This has caused far-reaching impacts on Afghanistan, culminating from overlapping interactions of natural disasters (due to changes in the climate system), conflict, agricultural dependency, and severe socio-economic hardship.  

Combined with infrequent earthquakes, climate-related disasters such as floods, flash floods, avalanches and heavy snowfalls on average affect 200,000 people every year, causing massive losses of lives, livelihoods and properties. These interacting factors, particularly protracted conflicts which erode and challenge the ability to handle, adapt to and plan for climate change at individual and national levels, often turn climate change risks and hazards into disasters. 

Although the country itself contributes only very little to global warming with regards to greenhouse gas emissions, droughts due to climate change affect and will affect Afghanistan to a high degree.

Due to a combination of political, geographic, and social factors, Afghanistan is one of the most vulnerable nations to climate change impacts in the world, ranked 176 out of 181 countries in the 2019 ND-GAIN Index. As of 2021, ADB has committed more than $900 million, for irrigation and agriculture infrastructure projects to help with food security, agribusiness, and enhancement of water resources management through a climate resilience approach.

Greenhouse gas emissions 
Afghanistan is among the lowest emitting countries on earth. In 2018, Afghanistan emitted 0.3 tons of carbon dioxide per capita.

Energy in Afghanistan is reliant especially on hydropower. Energy is imported as well from neighbouring countries.

Impacts 
The World Bank projects that Afghanistan will see a warming higher than the global average due to global warming, with rises in maximum and minimum temperatures expected to be higher than rises in average temperature. Since 1950, temperatures in Afghanistan have risen by 1.8°C. This leads and will lead to massive droughts. Due to these increased droughts related to a warming of all regions of the country by 2.0°C to 6.2°C by 2090 depending on scenario, Afghanistan will be confronted with desertification and land degradation. 35% of Afghanistan's population is suffering from food insecurity, with an increase projected. The increasing droughts could lead to a boom of the opium production in Afghanistan, as opium is drought-resistant.

In addition to droughts, extreme rainfall will increase due to climate change, which could lead to landslides.

The basin of the Kunduz River has seen a decrease in precipitation of 30% since the 1960s, which is compensated by increasing glacier melt. Almost 14% of Afghanistan's glacier coverage was lost between 1990 and 2015. By 2100, the region could lose 60% of its glaciers. The number of glaciers and glacial lakes increases in Afghanistan at the moment, probably due to the breaking up of larger glaciers. Mountainous regions such as the area at the source of the Amu Darya will be at great risk of glacial lake outburst floods.

A drought in 2017 and 2018 led to a massive internal displacement within the country. ActionAid claims that by 2050 around 5 million more people could become internally displaced within Afghanistan due to climate change.

The Taliban claimed in November 2022 that climate change was responsible for losses of more than two billion U.S. dollars in that year alone.

Adaptation 
In 2015, Afghanistan submitted a climate plan to the United Nations. The plan outlined that by 2030 2.5 billion USD were needed for watershed management and 4.5 billion USD for restoring irrigation systems.

The Taliban has lamented the loss of hundreds of millions in aid money for environmental projects since it took over the government in 2021, protested Afghanistan's exclusion from COP27, and has requested international aid in tackling climate change. The international community has so far been reluctant to engage with the Taliban due to its extreme social policies. The Taliban has argued that the climate crisis is not a political issue.

See also 

 Climate change in South Asia
 Drought in Afghanistan

References 

Climate of Afghanistan
Afghanistan
Afghanistan